Jubilee Street may refer to:

Places
Jubilee Street, Whitechapel, London - notable site of anarchist club pre-WWI
 Jubilee Street Club
Jubilee Street, Hong Kong
Jubilee Street Pier (Chinese: 租卑利街碼頭) old name for the United Pier, demolished in 1994 due to harbour infill

Music
Jubilee Street (song) by Nick Cave